This article is about the particular significance of the year 1966 to Wales and its people.

Incumbents

Secretary of State for Wales – Jim Griffiths (until 5 April); Cledwyn Hughes
Archbishop of Wales – Edwin Morris, Bishop of Monmouth
Archdruid of the National Eisteddfod of Wales
Cynan (outgoing)
E. Gwyndaf Evans (incoming)

Events
April – Future Welsh Secretary Peter Hain arrives in the UK from South Africa with his family.
12 May – Local elections take place across the county boroughs and districts, with the Conservatives winning a majority on Cardiff City Council for the first time in years.
18 June – Butlin's Barry Island holiday camp opens.
14 July – In the Carmarthen by-election, caused by the death of Megan Lloyd George, Gwynfor Evans wins Plaid Cymru's first Parliamentary seat.
22 July
Fifteen people are drowned at Penmaenpool in the Mawddach estuary.
The M4 motorway Port Talbot by-pass is officially opened by The Queen.
8 September – The Severn Bridge is opened.
21 October – At Aberfan, following heavy rain, a colliery waste tip collapses onto the village's primary school, killing 116 children and 28 adults. Cledwyn Hughes, Secretary of State for Wales, and his government colleague, George Thomas arrive on the scene late afternoon, followed, in the evening, by Prime Minister Harold Wilson.
22 October – Lord Robens, chairman of the National Coal Board, arrives in Aberfan after going ahead with his installation as Chancellor of the University of Surrey, despite news of the disaster.
26 October – The Welsh Office appoints the Aberfan Disaster Tribunal, chaired by Edmund Davies, Baron Edmund-Davies, to investigate the causes of the disaster.
27 October – Almost a week after the Aberfan disaster, writer and broadcaster Gwyn Thomas makes his famous radio tribute to the children of Aberfan.
30 October – The Queen and her consort Prince Philip, Duke of Edinburgh, arrive in Aberfan to pay their respects. It is reported that the Queen is moved to tears.
15 December – A concert in aid of the Aberfan disaster charity is held at London's Royal Albert Hall.

Arts and literature

Awards
British Press Awards – Special Award for Journalism – David Rhys Davies, Merthyr Express
National Eisteddfod of Wales (held in Aberavon)
National Eisteddfod of Wales: Chair – Dic Jones, "Cynhaeaf"
National Eisteddfod of Wales: Crown – Dafydd Jones, "Y Clawdd"
National Eisteddfod of Wales: Prose Medal – withheld

New books

English language
Peter Bartrum – Early Welsh Genealogical Tracts
Charles Jones – The Challenger
Raymond Williams – Modern Tragedy

Welsh language
Pennar Davies – Caregl Nwyf
Dyfnallt Morgan – Gwŷr Llên y Ddeunawfed Ganrif
Thomas John Morgan – Amryw Flawd

New drama
Gwenlyn Parry – Saer Doliau (Doll Doctor)

Music
Alun Hoddinott – Concerto no. 3, op. 44
Severn Bridge Variations (composite work composed by Malcolm Arnold, Alun Hoddinott, Nicholas Maw, Daniel Jones, Grace Williams and Michael Tippett)

Film
Richard Burton stars in Who's Afraid of Virginia Woolf? alongside his wife Elizabeth Taylor. The performance wins him a BAFTA Best Actor award.

Broadcasting
BBC Wales opens new studios in Llandaff.
19 December – BBC opens Llanidloes transmitting station.

Welsh-language television

English-language television
Hywel Bennett makes an impact in his first major TV role in Where the Buffalo Roam, a Wednesday Play.

Sport
Athletics – Lynn Davies becomes the first person to hold the European, Commonwealth and Olympic long jump titles simultaneously.
Football – Ivor Allchurch plays his final game for Wales, against Chile.
Rugby union
Phil Bennett makes his first appearance for Llanelli RFC.
Wales win the Five Nations Championship for the third successive year.
Tennis – Future rugby star J.P.R. Williams wins the junior championship at Wimbledon.
BBC Wales Sports Personality of the Year – Lynn Davies

Births
21 March – Matthew Maynard, cricketer
24 March – Mark Williams MP, politician
14 April – Lloyd Owen, actor
29 April – Carl Dale, footballer
3 May – Darren Morgan, snooker player
5 May – Nicky Piper, light-heavyweight boxer
8 July – Guto Harri, broadcaster
21 July – Sarah Waters, novelist
28 July – Andy Legg, footballer
16 August – Helen Thomas, Greenham Common campaigner
1 September – Elin Jones AM, politician
12 September – Niall Griffiths, English-born novelist
21 October – Phillip Price, golfer
10 November – Simon Richardson, cyclist
Date unknown – Saul David, historian

Deaths
20 January – Gordon Macdonald MP, politician, 81
21 January – William Davies, footballer, 83 
27 January – Ronald Armstrong-Jones, barrister, 66
18 February – Thomas Williams, 1st Baron Williams, 73
20 February – Emrys Evans, classicist and academic, 75
March – Wilfred Mitford Davies, artist and publisher, 71
April – Charlie Jones, footballer, 66
13 April – Lionel Edwards, artist, 87
25 April – Iorrie Isaacs, Wales international rugby player, 54
26 April – Bill Everson,  Wales international rugby player, 60
11 May – Thomas Hughes Jones, poet and author, 71
14 May – Megan Lloyd George MP, politician, 64
1 June – Peter George, author, 42 (suicide)
23 June – Melbourne Thomas, rugby player, 70
9 June – Elizabeth Watkin-Jones, children's author, 88
17 July – Albert Freethy, rugby referee and cricketer, 81
23 August – Ivor Hughes, speedway rider, 27 (killed in track accident)
27 August – Cecil Pritchard, rugby player, 64 
21 September – Sir Thomas Williams Phillips, civil servant, 83
24 September – Arthur Green, footballer, 85
26 September – Phil Hopkins, Wales international rugby player, 86
3 December – Iorwerth Thomas, politician, 71
23 November – Alvin Langdon Coburn, American-born pictorialist photographer, 84
date unknown – Simon Bartholomew Jones, minister and poet

See also
1966 in Northern Ireland

References

 
Wales